Roberta Close (Roberta Gambine Moreira; born 7 December 1964) is a Brazilian fashion model, actress and television personality. She is constantly mentioned in the media as one of the greatest Brazilian icons and one of the main sex symbols in the country between the 1980s and 1990s, in addition to being a pioneer of transfeminism in her native country.

Biography 
After debuting as a star at Carnaval in 1980, Close gained notoriety as the main character of the clip for the song Dá Um Close Nela, by Erasmo Carlos, in 1984. In the video, which achieved great commercial success after the release on Fantástico, she plays a transvestite who attracts male gazes as she walks through the streets of Rio de Janeiro.  The same year, she became the first transgender model to appear in Playboy magazine, in a record-selling issue upon launch. Later, Roberta Close has appeared on the catwalk for numerous fashion houses, including Thierry Mugler, Guy Laroche, Jean Paul Gaultier . She also been featured in editorials for Vogue and wrote a memoir called Muito Prazer, Roberta Close (1997).

Filmography 

 1984: Big Close - TV Series; talk-show host
 1987: Uma Vez por Semana - stage play; actress
 1987: No Rio Vale Tudo - movie; actress
 1990: O Escorpião Escarlate - movie; actress
 1997: Mandacaru - TV Series; actress
 1999: O Lobo da Madrugada - stage play; actress
 1999: Performance - stage play; actress
 2000: Zorra Total - TV Series; actress
 2000: De Noite na Cama -  TV Series; talk-show host
 2002: Kinky Gerlinky - movie; documentary character

Personal life 
In 1993, Close married Roland Granacher. The wedding to her Swiss husband took place in Europe, as it would not have been legal in Brazil. She lives with Granacher in Zurich and Paris. In May 2015, Close told Brazilian television host Gugu Liberato that she recently underwent genetic testing that revealed she is intersex. She was issued a new birth certificate by the Office of Public Records of the 4th district of Rio de Janeiro, which states that on December 7, 1964, a child of the female sex was born and was given the name "Roberta Gambine Moreira".

References

External links
Luiz Gambine Moreira - "Roberta Close"

Colectivos piden en Parlamento Vasco inclusión en Sanidad Publica de cirugías reasignación

1964 births
Intersex women
Intersex models
Brazilian LGBT actors
Living people
People from Rio de Janeiro (city)
Transgender female models
Transgender actresses
Travestis
Brazilian transgender people